In mathematics, the either–or topology is a topological structure defined on the closed interval [−1, 1] by declaring a set open if it either does not contain {0} or does contain (−1, 1).

References

General topology